Augusto Bandini (born 1889) was an Italian film actor. He appeared in more than forty productions, the majority of them during the silent era.

Selected filmography
 Emperor Maciste (1924)
 Maciste's American Nephew (1924)
 Chief Saetta (1924)
 Saetta Learns to Live (1924)
 Pleasure Train (1924)
 Maciste in the Lion's Cage (1926)
 Beatrice Cenci (1926)
 The Giant of the Dolomites (1927)
 Goodbye Youth (1927)
 Floretta and Patapon (1927)
 The Last Tsars (1928)
 The Golden Vein (1928)
 The Confessions of a Woman (1928)
 Latin Quarter (1929)
 Judith and Holofernes (1929)
 Miss Europe (1930)
 The Man with the Claw (1931)
 Before the Jury (1931)
 Figaro and His Great Day (1931)
 Five to Nil (1932)

References

Bibliography
 Vacche, Angela Dalle. Diva: Defiance and Passion in Early Italian Cinema. University of Texas Press, 2008.

External links

1889 births
Year of death unknown
Italian male film actors
Italian male silent film actors
20th-century Italian male actors
Male actors from Rome